Founded in 1625, the Régiment de Touraine was a French infantry regiment raised in the province of Touraine.

Origins

At the end of 1624, the Protestant stronghold of La Rochelle sent an expedition and besieged Port Louis in Brittany.  As no troops were stationed in this province at this time, Louis XIII sent Marshal Bassompierre, which, from Angers, urged Baron du Plessis-Joigny, governor of this city, to create an infantry regiment. The Protestant expedition on Port-Louis was cancelled before the arrival of the newly raised regiment, but it victoriously took part to the siege of the rebellious city between 1627 and 1628.

In May 1636 the regiment received the name of Touraine and its regimental flags. During the Fronde the colonels took advantage of the weakening of royal authority and did away with the provincial title of their regiments. Subsequently, the Touraine  regiment appeared as the Régiment d'Amboise, de Kercado or de Chambellay according to the name of its colonel.

Franco-Spanish War

During the Franco-Spanish War, the Regiment de Touraine participated to the Italian campaign where it successfully attacked Spanish possessions in Northern Italy, including Ceva, Pianezza, Mondovì and took part to the famous siege of Turin.

Franco-Dutch War and War of the Reunions

After Turenne's death, the regiment participated to the siege of Valenciennes (1676-1677) the Battle of Cassel (1677) and the Siege of Luxembourg (1684).

Nine Years War

War of the Spanish Succession

War of the Polish Succession

War of the Austrian Succession

The regiment was present at  the battle of Fontenoy 1745 and  the sieges of Tournai, Termonde and Ath. In 1746 it fought at the battle of Rocoux and the siege of Namur. In 1747 it was at the battle of Lauffeld and participated at the siege of Bergen op Zoom. It was at the siege of Maastricht in 1748.

Seven Years' War

In 1757 Touraine fought at battle of Hastenbeck. It was at the battle of Krefeld in 1758. The regiment was present at the battle of Minden in 1759 and the siege of Mǚnster. It fought at Warburg in 1760, covering the retreat of the army.

American Revolutionary War

The regiment, commanded by Vicomte de Poudeux, was among forces under Saint Simon brought from the West Indies to Yorktown. Régiment de Touraine principal engagements: Yorktown ; St Christophe ; Les Saintes.

French Revolution

In 1791, the provincial names of the French regiments were abolished and a number was assigned to each of them. Thus the regiment of Touraine became the 33rd line infantry regiment.

Gallery

See also
Jean Thurel

References

Military units and formations of France in the American Revolutionary War
Military units and formations established in 1625
Military units and formations disestablished in 1791
Line infantry regiments of the Ancien Régime